Jean-Guy Pilon,  (12 November 1930 – 27 April 2021) was a Quebec poet.

Born in Saint-Polycarpe, Quebec, he received a law degree from the Université de Montréal in 1954.

Honours
 In 1967, he was elected a Fellow of the Royal Society of Canada.
 In 1984, he was awarded the Prix Athanase-David.
 In 1987, he was made an Officer of the Order of Canada.
 In 1988, he was made a Knight of the National Order of Quebec.

References

External links
 Jean-Guy Pilon in The Canadian Encyclopedia

1930 births
2021 deaths
French Quebecers
20th-century Canadian poets
Canadian male poets
Fellows of the Royal Society of Canada
Knights of the National Order of Quebec
Officers of the Order of Canada
Writers from Quebec
Université de Montréal alumni
Canadian poets in French
Prix Athanase-David winners
20th-century Canadian male writers
People from Montérégie